Donald Ray Williams (May 27, 1939 – September 8, 2017) was an American country singer, songwriter, and 2010 inductee into the Country Music Hall of Fame. He began his solo career in 1971, singing popular ballads and amassing seventeen number one country hits. His straightforward yet smooth bass-baritone voice, soft tones, and imposing build earned him the nickname "The Gentle Giant". In 1975, Williams starred in a movie with Burt Reynolds and Jerry Reed called W.W. and the Dixie Dancekings.

Williams has had a strong influence over a variety of performers of different genres. His songs have been recorded by singers such as Johnny Cash, Eric Clapton, Juice Newton, Claude Russell Bridges, Lefty Frizzell, Josh Turner, Sonny James, Alison Krauss, Billy Dean, Charley Pride, Kenny Rogers, Lambchop, Alan Jackson, Tomeu Penya, Telly Savalas, Waylon Jennings, Pete Townshend, and Tortoise with Bonnie "Prince" Billy. His music is also popular internationally, including in the UK, Australia, New Zealand, Ireland, Ukraine, India, Ethiopia, Cameroon, Nigeria, Ghana, Kenya, Malawi, South Africa, Sierra Leone,Tanzania,Uganda,Zambia, Namibia and Zimbabwe.  In 2010, the Country Music Association inducted Don Williams into the Country Music Hall of Fame.

Early years
Williams was born, the youngest of three sons, on May 27, 1939, in Floydada, Texas, United States. His parents were Loveta Mae (née Lambert; 1914 – 2007) and James Andrew "Jim" Williams (1898 – 1982). He grew up in Portland, Texas, and graduated from Gregory-Portland High School in 1958. After Williams' parents divorced, Loveta Williams remarried, first to Chester Lang and then to Robert Bevers.

On July 20, 1963, Williams' eldest brother Kenneth died from electrocution when he accidentally touched a live wire. He was 29 years old.

Prior to forming the folk-pop group Pozo-Seco Singers, Williams served with the United States Army Security Agency for two years. After an honorable discharge, he worked various odd jobs in order to support himself and his family.

It was with the group the Pozo-Seco Singers that Williams, alongside Susan Taylor and Lofton Cline, recorded several records for Columbia Records. He remained with the group until 1969; it disbanded the following year.

Solo career
After the Pozo-Seco Singers disbanded, Williams briefly worked outside the music industry. Soon, however, Williams resumed his career in music. In December 1971, Williams signed on as a songwriter for Jack Clement with Jack Music Inc. In 1972, Williams inked a contract with JMI Records as a solo country artist. His 1974 song "We Should Be Together" reached number five, and he signed with ABC/Dot Records. At the height of the country and western boom in the UK in 1976, he had top-forty pop chart hits with "You're My Best Friend" and "I Recall a Gypsy Woman".

His first single with ABC/Dot, "I Wouldn't Want to Live If You Didn't Love Me," became a number one hit, and was the first of a string of top ten hits he had between 1974 and 1991. Only four of his 46 singles did not make it to the top ten during that time.

"I Believe in You", written by Roger Cook and Sam Hogin, was Williams' eleventh number one on the country chart. It was his only Top 40 chart entry in the U.S., where it peaked at number 24. It was also a hit in Australia, New Zealand and Europe.

Williams had some minor roles in Burt Reynolds movies. In 1975, Williams appeared as a member of the Dixie Dancekings band in the movie W.W. and the Dixie Dancekings, alongside Reynolds. Williams also appeared as himself in the Universal Pictures movie Smokey and the Bandit II, in which he also played a number of songs.

Early in 2006, Williams announced his "Farewell Tour of the World" and played numerous dates both in the U.S. and abroad, wrapping the tour up with a sold-out "Final Farewell Concert" in Memphis, Tennessee, at the Cannon Center for Performing Arts on November 21, 2006. In 2010, Williams came out of retirement and was once again touring.

In March 2012, Williams announced the release of a new record, And So It Goes (UK release April 30, 2012; U.S./Worldwide release June 19, 2012), his first new record since 2004. The record was his first with the independent Americana label Sugar Hill Records. The record includes guest appearances by Alison Krauss, Keith Urban, and Vince Gill. To accompany the release he embarked on a UK Tour. A much-loved country artist among British fans, he had his final UK tour in 2014.

In March 2016, Williams announced he was retiring from touring and cancelled all his scheduled shows. "It's time to hang my hat up and enjoy some quiet time at home. I'm so thankful for my fans, my friends and my family for their everlasting love and support," he said in a statement.

Personal life and death
Williams married Joy Janene Bucher in April 1960. They had two children.

On September 8, 2017, Williams died in Mobile, Alabama, of emphysema.

Awards

Wins
Academy of Country Music Awards (ACM)
 1978: ACM Single Record of the Year — Tulsa Time
Country Music Association Awards (CMA)
 1978: Male Vocalist of the Year
Americana Music Honors & Awards
 2022: President's Award

Nominations
Academy of Country Music (ACM)
 1976 / 1977 / 1978 / 1979 / 1980: ACM Top Male Vocalist 
 1980: ACM Album of the Year — I Believe in You
 1980: ACM Single Record of the Year — "I Believe in You"
 1982: ACM Album of the Year — Listen to the Radio

Country Music Association (CMA)
 1976 / 1977 / 1979 / 1980 / 1981: CMA Male Vocalist of the Year
 1978 CMA Album of the Year — Country Boy

Discography
Albums

1973: Don Williams Volume One1974: Don Williams Volume Two1974: Don Williams Vol. III1975: You're My Best Friend1976: Harmony1977: Visions1977: Country Boy1978: Expressions1979: Portrait1980: I Believe in You1981: Especially for You1982: Listen to the Radio1983: Yellow Moon1984: Cafe Carolina1986: New Moves1987: Traces1987: One Good Well1990: True Love1992: Currents1995: Borrowed Tales1996: Flatlands1998: I Turn the Page2004: My Heart to You2012: And So It Goes2014: Reflections''

Songs written

References

External links

1939 births
2017 deaths
People from Floydada, Texas
People from Portland, Texas
American male singer-songwriters
Country musicians from Texas
Country musicians from Alabama
Singer-songwriters from Texas
MCA Records artists
American country singer-songwriters
United States Army soldiers
MNRK Music Group artists
Columbia Records artists
Dot Records artists
ABC Records artists
Capitol Records artists
RCA Records Nashville artists
Vanguard Records artists
Sugar Hill Records artists
Giant Records (Warner) artists
Grand Ole Opry members
Country Music Hall of Fame inductees
Members of the Country Music Association
American country guitarists
American acoustic guitarists
Guitarists from Texas
Deaths from emphysema
American male guitarists
Singer-songwriters from Alabama